Georgi Semerdzhiev (born 8 August 1986) is a former professional football player from Bulgaria, who played as a forward.

On July 5th, 2022, in Sofia, Bulgaria, while on drugs, Semerdzhiev was going over the speed limit in a SUV with fake license plates and with no driver's license. He ran a red light, hitting a taxi and killing two women, aged 21 and 26, on the sidewalk. He fled the scene but was arrested on the next day in an apartment a few hundred meters from the car accident. Semerdzhiev has a criminal record. In 2020 he was investigated for participating in an illegal sports betting scheme. There are also reports that he was involved in the distribution of drugs.

References

External links
Guardian's Stats Centre

1986 births
Living people
Bulgarian footballers
21st-century Bulgarian criminals
Footballers from Sofia
Association football forwards
OFC Vihren Sandanski players
PFC Rodopa Smolyan players
Botev Plovdiv players
FC Sportist Svoge players
First Professional Football League (Bulgaria) players